The Clyde River is a river in Lanark County in Eastern Ontario, Canada. It is in the Saint Lawrence River drainage basin, is a left tributary of the Mississippi River, and was named after the River Clyde in Scotland.

Course
The Clyde flows south from its source at the outflow from Clyde Lake in geographic Lavant Township in the municipality of Lanark Highlands to the community of Clyde Forks, where it takes in the right tributaries Middle Branch Clyde River and South Branch Clyde River. To this point, the river is paralleled by the K&P Rail Trail which follows the course of the former Kingston and Pembroke Railway. The river then heads east, then southeast into geographic Darling Township then geographic Lanark Township, takes in the right tributary Little Clyde River, and arrives at the community of Lanark. The river continues south passing briefly through geographic Drummond Township in the municipality of Drummond/North Elmsley, then reaches its mouth at the Mississippi River in geographic Bathurst Township in the municipality of Tay Valley, north of the town of Perth. The Mississippi River flows via the Ottawa River to the Saint Lawrence River.

Tributaries
Middleville Creek (left)
Hopetown Creek (right)
Bennys Creek (left)
Little Clyde River (right)
Eastons Creek (right)
Black Creek (right)
Edmunds Creek (left)
Pilons Creek (left)
Lavant Creek (right)
McCreas Creek (left)
La France Creek (right)
South Branch Clyde River (right)
Middle Branch Clyde Creek (right)
Clyde Lake
Baldwin Depot Creek

References

Sources

See also
List of rivers of Ontario

Rivers of Lanark County
Tributaries of the Ottawa River